Débora Srour (born 19 March 1962) is a Brazilian sports shooter. She competed in the women's 25 metre pistol event at the 1984 Summer Olympics.

References

1962 births
Living people
Brazilian female sport shooters
Olympic shooters of Brazil
Shooters at the 1984 Summer Olympics
Sportspeople from São Paulo